Route 23, also known as Selkirk Road, is a , two-lane, uncontrolled-access, secondary highway in central Prince Edward Island. Its southern terminus is at Route 315 in Wood Islands and its northern terminus is at Route 210 in Orwell. The route is entirely in Queens County and it is generally a straight line between its termini.

References 

023
023